Shannon Bell (born 5 July 1955) is a Canadian performance philosopher who lives and writes philosophy-in-action, experimental philosophy. Bell is also professor and graduate programme director in the York University Political Science Department, Toronto, Ontario, Canada. She teaches postmodern theory, fast feminism, sexual politics, cyber politics, identity politics and violent philosophy.

Research 
Bell is researching extreme science and art for her book entitled Fast Bodies; this research is funded by Social Science and Humanities Research Council (SSHRC). Bell's most recent on-going research project Shooting Theory (2007–20) brings together digital video technology and print textual philosophy/theory through imaging philosophical/theoretical concepts. Bell's research also includes:
applying continental and post-structural theory to bio, techno and performance artists' artwork and thinkers' body of work; aspects of sexuality; and, General Semantics.

Bibliography
Books

 
 
 
 
 
 
 Gad Horowitz and Shannon Bell, eds (2016). The Book of Radical General Semantics (Delhi: Pencraft International) .
Co-authored Book

	Brenda Cossman, Shannon Bell, Lise Gotell, Becki Ross (2017) Bad Attitude\s on Trial: Pornography, Feminism and the Butler Decision (Toronto: University of Toronto Press) 
[Republished in The Canadian 150 Collection].  
	
	Brenda Cossman, Shannon Bell, Lise Gotell, Becki Ross (1997) Bad Attitude\s on Trial: Pornography, Feminism and the Butler Decision (Toronto: University of Toronto Press).

See also 
 Posthumanism

External links 
 York University page

1955 births
Canadian feminists
Postmodern feminists
Posthumanists
Canadian socialists
Canadian socialist feminists
Academic staff of York University
Living people
Canadian women philosophers
20th-century Canadian philosophers
21st-century Canadian philosophers